Anna Katharina Wienhard (born 1977) is a German mathematician whose research concerns differential geometry, and especially the use of higher Teichmüller spaces to study the deformation theory of symmetric geometric structures. She is a professor at Heidelberg University.

Education and career
Wienhard did her undergraduate studies at the University of Bonn, earning a double degree in theology and mathematics. Continuing at Bonn, she earned a doctorate in 2004 under the joint supervision of Hans Werner Ballmann and Marc Burger.

After holding temporary positions at the University of Basel, Institute for Advanced Study, and University of Chicago, she took a faculty position at Princeton University in 2007. She moved to Heidelberg as a full professor in 2012.

Recognition
From 2009 to 2013, Wienhard was a member of the Young Academy of the German Academy of Sciences Leopoldina and Berlin-Brandenburg Academy of Sciences and Humanities. In 2012, she became one of the inaugural fellows of the American Mathematical Society.

She was the Emmy Noether Lecturer of the German Mathematical Society in 2012, and an invited speaker at the 2018 International Congress of Mathematicians. She was named MSRI Clay Senior Scholar for Fall 2019.

References

External links
Wienhard's home page at Heidelberg University

1977 births
Living people
21st-century German mathematicians
German women mathematicians
University of Bonn alumni
Princeton University faculty
Academic staff of Heidelberg University
Fellows of the American Mathematical Society
Geometers
21st-century women mathematicians
21st-century German women